Hanna Batsiushka (born October 24, 1981) is a Belarusian weightlifter.

She competed in the Women's 63 kg weight class at the 2004 Summer Olympics and won the silver medal, lifting 242.5 kg in total.

She set a new world record of 115 kg in snatch during the competition. She held the old record of 113.5 kg which she achieved at the 2003 World Championships where she won the bronze.

She won another bronze at the 2007 European Weightlifting Championships in the 63 kg category. At the 2008 Summer Olympics she ranked 7th in the 69 kg category.

Notes and references

External links
 Athlete Biography at beijing2008

1981 births
Living people
Belarusian female weightlifters
Weightlifters at the 2000 Summer Olympics
Weightlifters at the 2004 Summer Olympics
Weightlifters at the 2008 Summer Olympics
Olympic weightlifters of Belarus
Olympic silver medalists for Belarus
Olympic medalists in weightlifting
Medalists at the 2004 Summer Olympics
European Weightlifting Championships medalists
World Weightlifting Championships medalists
20th-century Belarusian women
21st-century Belarusian women